Walnut Creek Ranger Station, also known as Walnut Creek Work Center, in Prescott National Forest near Prescott, Arizona was built in 1931 by the Civilian Conservation Corps.  It was listed on the National Register of Historic Places in 1993 for its architecture, which is Bungalow/Craftsman style.  It was designed by architects of the United States Forest Service.  It served historically as institutional housing and as government office space.  The NRHP listing included two contributing buildings on a  area.

Its residence is built to standard plan A-5 with some modifications.  A-5 would be a four-room bungalow with a side-gabled roof with a dormer;  the dormer was omitted here.  It includes the two porches that are standard features.  The barn/garage/shop was built to standard plan C-10.

References

United States Forest Service ranger stations
American Craftsman architecture in Arizona
Bungalow architecture in Arizona
Civilian Conservation Corps in Arizona
Park buildings and structures on the National Register of Historic Places in Arizona
Government buildings completed in 1931
Buildings and structures in Yavapai County, Arizona
1931 establishments in Arizona
National Register of Historic Places in Prescott, Arizona